Nina Ricci (born Maria Nielli; 1883 – 1970) was an Italian-born French fashion designer.

She was born in Turin, Italy, and moved to France at the age of 12.

At the age of 13, she began an apprenticeship at a dressmaker's.

In 1904, she married Luigi Ricci. They had one child, Robert.

In 1908, she joined the House of Raffin, where she remained for decades.

She and her son Robert founded the fashion house Nina Ricci in Paris in 1932; it has been owned by the Spanish company Puig since 1998.

References

External links

 
 

1883 births
1970 deaths
French fashion designers
French women fashion designers
Italian emigrants to France
Puig